"Next in Line" is a song written by Wayne Kemp and Curtis Wayne, and recorded by American country music artist Conway Twitty.  It was released in August 1968 as the first single and title track from the album Next in Line.  The song was Twitty's sixth entry to make the country charts and his first of 54 number ones on all the country charts. His 2nd number one overall ("It's Only Make Believe" went to number one in 1958 on the Pop charts.) The single spent a single week at number one and spent a total of 13 weeks within the top 40.

Personnel
Conway Twitty — lead vocals
Joe E. Lewis, The Jordanaires — background vocals
Ray Edenton — acoustic guitar
John Hughey — steel guitar
Tommy "Porkchop" Markham — drums and percussion
Norbert Putnam — bass
Hargus "Pig" Robbins — piano
Jerry Shook — six-string bass guitar
Herman Wade — electric guitar

Chart performance

References

1968 singles
Conway Twitty songs
Songs written by Wayne Kemp
Song recordings produced by Owen Bradley
Decca Records singles
1968 songs